Senator Evans may refer to:

Members of the United States Senate
Daniel J. Evans (born 1925), U.S. Senator from Washington from 1983 to 1989
George Evans (American politician) (1797–1867), U.S. Senator from Maine from 1841 to 1847
Josiah J. Evans (1786–1858), U.S. Senator from South Carolina from 1853 to 1858

United States state senate members
Abel John Evans (1852–1939), Utah State Senate
Alonzo H. Evans (1820–1907), Massachusetts State Senate
Cheryl A. Gray Evans (born 1968), Louisiana State Senate
Clement A. Evans (1833–1911), Georgia State Senate
David Ellicott Evans (1788–1850), New York State Senate
David H. Evans (1837–1920), New York State Senate
George S. Evans (1826–1883), California State Senate
Henry H. Evans (1836–1917), Illinois State Senate
James Evans (Utah politician) (fl. 2010s), Utah State Senate
John Evans (Idaho governor) (1925–2014), Idaho State Senate
Joseph P. Evans (1835–1889), Virginia State Senate
Kenneth A. Evans (1898–1970), Iowa State Senate
Marcellus H. Evans (1884–1953), New York State Senate
Noreen Evans (born 1955), California State Senate
Walter Evans (American politician) (1842–1923), Kentucky State Senate

See also
James Edgar Evins (1883–1954), Tennessee State Senate